The Greek Melkite Catholic Eparchy of Canada, also known as the Melkite Eparchy of Canada or the Melkite Greek Catholic Eparchy of Saint-Sauveur of Montréal (Latin: Eparchia Sanctissimi Salvatoris Marianopolitansis Graecorum Melkitarum Catholicorum), is an eparchy of the Melkite Greek Catholic Church in Canada. It is based at Saint Sauveur Cathedral in Montreal, Quebec.

Territory
The eparchy includes the faithful of the Melkite Greek Catholic Church in Canada. Its eparchial seat is the city of Montreal, where Saint Sauveur Cathedral is located. The name of the eparchy is derived from Saint-Sauveur (French for 'Holy Saviour').

As of 2020, the eparchy had around 40,000 baptized members, and it is divided into fourteen parishes.

History
On April 9, 1968, Pope Paul VI founded the Apostolic Exarchate in Canada by the apostolic constitution Qui benignissimo. On October 13, 1980, Pope John Paul II issued a bull Qui benignissimo, which established the Apostolic Exarchate of the Saint-Sauveur. On September 1, 1984, Pope John Paul II issued a bull Beati Petri, which transformed the Apostolic Exarchate of the Saint-Sauveur into an eparchy.

Communities
The eparchy has parishes in Montreal, Pierrefonds-Roxboro, Laval, Brossard, Quebec City, Ottawa, Toronto, Etobicoke-Mississauga, Hamilton, London, Windsor, Calgary, Edmonton and Vancouver.

It also includes the Canadian jurisdictions of two orders associated with the Melkite Greek Catholic Church – the Order of Saint Lazarus and the Canadian lieutenancy of the Patriarchal Order of the Holy Cross of Jerusalem.

Ordinaries
Apostolic Exarch of Canada
Michel Hakim, BS (13 October 1980 – 1 September 1984)

Bishops of Saint-Sauveur of Montréal
Michel Hakim, BS (1 September 1984 – 30 June 1998),
Sleiman Hajjar, BS (10 July 1998 – 10 March 2002)
Ibrahim M. Ibrahim, BS (18 June 2003 – 26 June 2021)
Milad Jawish, BS (18 September 2021 – present)

References

External links

Missa.org
Mliles.com
Catholic-hierarchy.org
Gcatholic.org
Sample of Melkite Chant in English, Arabic, and Greek

Melkite Greek Catholic Church in Canada
Melkite Greek Catholic eparchies
Eastern Catholic dioceses in Canada
Christian organizations established in 1984
Religion in Quebec
1984 establishments in Quebec